Wild Horse Rustlers is a 1943 American Western film directed by Sam Newfield and written by Joseph O'Donnell. The film stars Robert Livingston as the Lone Rider and Al St. John as his sidekick "Fuzzy Jones", with Lane Chandler, Linda Leighton, Frank Ellis and Stanley Price. The film was released on February 12, 1943, by Producers Releasing Corporation.

This is the thirteenth movie in the "Lone Rider" series, and the second starring Robert Livingston. The first eleven movies star George Houston.

Plot
Tom Cameron, the Lone Rider, discovers that a gang of Nazi spies are interfering with the federal government's plans to round up horses for military service—and, worse, that his own twin brother is helping them.

Continuity
The murder of Tom Cameron's family was a major plot point in the first "Lone Rider" movie, The Lone Rider Rides On. In that movie, the reveal that Tom's brother had survived was the movie's big twist. His brother sacrificed himself heroically at the end of the movie, with no mention that Tom had another surviving twin brother.

Reception
According to media historian Hal Erickson, "Wild Horse Rustlers was PRC's 1943 entry in the "Nazis on the prairie" western cycle... Minus the propaganda angle, this is merely another cattle-rustling opus, with the standard western bad guys saying "Seig heil!" instead of "Let's get outta here!" As was usual at PRC, Al "Fuzzy"St. John provides the film's best moments."

Cast          
Robert Livingston as Tom Cameron, the Lone Rider 
Al St. John as Fuzzy Q. Jones 
Lane Chandler as Smoky Moore / Hans Beckmann
Linda Leighton as Ellen Walden 
Frank Ellis as Jake Greene
Stanley Price as Bruce Collins
Karl Hackett as The Sheriff
Jimmy Aubrey as Jail Guard
Robert F. Hill as Judge

See also
The "Lone Rider" films starring George Houston:
 The Lone Rider Rides On (1941)
 The Lone Rider Crosses the Rio (1941)
 The Lone Rider in Ghost Town (1941)
 The Lone Rider in Frontier Fury (1941)
 The Lone Rider Ambushed (1941)
 The Lone Rider Fights Back (1941)
 The Lone Rider and the Bandit (1942)
 The Lone Rider in Cheyenne (1942)
 The Lone Rider in Texas Justice (1942)
 Border Roundup (1942)
 Outlaws of Boulder Pass (1942)
starring Robert Livingston: 
 Overland Stagecoach (1942)
 Wild Horse Rustlers (1943)
 Death Rides the Plains (1943)
 Wolves of the Range (1943)
 Law of the Saddle (1943)
 Raiders of Red Gap (1943)

References

External links
 

1943 films
American Western (genre) films
1943 Western (genre) films
Producers Releasing Corporation films
Films directed by Sam Newfield
American black-and-white films
1940s English-language films
1940s American films